Pooch the Pup is a cartoon animal character, an anthropomorphic dog, appearing in Walter Lantz cartoons during the studio's black-and-white era. The character appeared in 13 shorts made in 1932 and 1933.

Biography
In 1931, Walter Lantz was encountering slight financial troubles. One way to cope with the problems was to conceive a new series featuring a new character, thus leading to the appearance of Pooch the Pup. While Lantz went on to direct the Pooch the Pup shorts, his colleague Bill Nolan would focus on the long-running Oswald the Lucky Rabbit cartoons.

When surprised about something, Pooch would say "Heh!" in a squeaky fashion. And when his girlfriend is in trouble, he pounds his chest and makes a Tarzan-esque shout before moving.

Pooch made his debut in The Athlete. Here, he was a white-furred bloodhound with long black ears. In Pin Feathers, he had black fur, making him appear very similar to Oswald, except for his long, hairless tail.

Pooch's last hurrah was in She Done Him Right, a parody of a movie called She Done Him Wrong. Following his retirement from the screen, Oswald was seen in two cartoons wearing a jacket similar to Pooch's. It was suggested that the two Oswald shorts were initially designed to feature Pooch.

Filmography

 The Athlete (August 29, 1932)
 The Butcher Boy (September 26, 1932)
 The Crowd Snores (October 24, 1932)
 The Under Dog (November 7, 1932)
 [[Cats and Dogs (1932 film)|Cats and Dogs]] (December 5, 1932)Cats And Dogs (1932) - from the Pooch the Pup Theatrical Cartoon Series
 Merry Dog (January 2, 1933)Merry Dog (1933) - from the Pooch the Pup Theatrical Cartoon Series
 The Terrible Troubadour (January 30, 1933)The Terrible Troubadour (1933) - from the Pooch the Pup Theatrical Cartoon Series
 The Lumber Champ (March 13, 1933)The Lumber Champ (1933) - from the Pooch the Pup Theatrical Cartoon Series
 Nature's Workshop (June 5, 1933)Nature's Workshop (1933) - from the Pooch the Pup Theatrical Cartoon Series
 Pin Feathers (July 3, 1933)Pin-Feathers (1933) - from the Pooch the Pup Theatrical Cartoon Series
 Hot and Cold (August 14, 1933)Hot And Cold (S.O.S. Icicle) (1933) - from the Pooch the Pup Theatrical Cartoon Series
 King Klunk (September 4, 1933)King Klunk (1933) - from the Pooch the Pup Theatrical Cartoon Series
 She Done Him Right (October 9, 1933)She Done Him Right (1933) - from the Pooch the Pup Theatrical Cartoon Series

Note: One source listed S.O.S. Icicle (May 8, 1933) as a separate cartoon, while another claimed it was a working title for Hot & Cold''.

See also
 List of Walter Lantz cartoons
 List of Walter Lantz cartoon characters

References

External links 
 
 The Walter Lantz-o-Pedia

Fictional anthropomorphic characters
Universal Pictures cartoons and characters
Anthropomorphic dogs
Film characters introduced in 1932
Walter Lantz Productions cartoons and characters